David Prentis, Baron Prentis of Leeds (born 29 May 1948) is a British trade unionist and former General Secretary of UNISON, the United Kingdom's largest trade union. He was originally elected in 2000. He was re-elected in March 2005, with 77% of the vote, in 2010 (with 67% of the vote), and in 2015 (with 49% of the vote).

Early life
Prentis was born and brought up in Leeds where he attended St Michael's College from 1959 to 1967. He went to the University of London where he took a BA in History, then studied Economic History at the London School of Economics. This was followed by a master's degree in Industrial relations at the University of Warwick.

Trade unions
He joined NALGO in 1975, and in 1990 he became its deputy general secretary. He was UNISON's deputy general secretary (DGS) from its formation in July 1993, when it was formed from NALGO, NUPE and CoHSE.

UNISON leadership
In his role as the deputy general secretary, Prentis directed UNISON's national negotiating team and oversaw the union's policy making functions. He also drove through a strategic review of the union, aimed at delivering key reforms, to bring union services closer to the members. In 2001, he succeeded Rodney Bickerstaffe as General Secretary of UNISON, having been elected in February 2000.

Prentis was responsible for 1,500 staff and a turnover of around £160 million. As General Secretary, he received a total salary and benefits package worth £112,114 in the accounting year ending 31 December 2013.

He was a member of the TUC General Council, TUC executive committee and the Trade Union Labour Party Liaison Committee. He was elected President of the TUC for the year 2008.

In July 2020, he announced his decision to step down at the end of the year. Christina McAnea was elected as his successor in a ballot of members, in which she won 47.7% of the vote.

It was announced on 14 October 2022, that as part of the 2022 Special Honours, Prentis would receive a life peerage, sitting for the Labour Party. On 18 November 2022, he was created Baron Prentis of Leeds, of Harehills in the City of Leeds.

Public appointments
Trustee of the Institute for Public Policy Research (IPPR) and also Catalyst, two centre-left research bodies
Adviser to the Warwick Institute of Governance and Public Management
Visiting fellow of Nuffield College, Oxford
Member of various joint working parties with the government and the CBI
President of Unity Trust Bank
 since, 1 June 2012, non-executive director of the Bank of England.  The initial appointment is until 31 May 2015.  For the accounting year 2013/14 non-executive directors of the Bank of England received total remuneration of £165,458.

Personal life
In 2000, he was diagnosed with cancer of the oesophagus and stomach. He had much of his stomach removed, underwent chemotherapy, and then contracted MRSA in hospital.  Since his recovery from cancer he has been unable to eat large meals.

References

External links

 UNISON

News items
 Telegraph article August 2008
 Elected in February 2000

1948 births
Alumni of the University of Warwick
General Secretaries of Unison (trade union)
Trade unionists from Leeds
Alumni of the London School of Economics
Living people
Members of the General Council of the Trades Union Congress
Presidents of the Trades Union Congress
People educated at Mount St Mary's Catholic High School, Leeds
Labour Party (UK) life peers
Life peers created by Charles III